Her Marriage Vow is a 1924 American drama film written and directed by Millard Webb. The film stars Monte Blue, Willard Louis, Beverly Bayne, Margaret Livingston, John Roche and Priscilla Moran. The film was released by Warner Bros. on July 20, 1924.

Plot 
As described in a review in a film magazine, Carol Pelham (Bayne) turns down the wealthy idler, Ted Lowe (Roche), and marries a hard-working chap, Bob Hilton (Blue). For seven years their life is happy, even though Carol is kept pretty well confined to her home taking care of it and her two little girls. A flighty friend, Estelle (Livingston) takes an apartment in the same building and Carol again meets with Ted, who starts to make love to her. Piqued at the fact that Bob leaves her alone to work at night causes her to attend a party in Estelle's apartment where she imbibes too freely. Bob catches Ted kissing her and putting a necklace on her while she sleeps after finding roses from Ted in his own apartment. Mistrusting her, he casts her out and the court awards him the children, but he is lonely and continues to love Carol. Finally unable to stand it any longer, Carol steals into Bob's home and the children beg her to take them with her. A noise causes Bob to hear her and, stealing out on a balcony, he fires into the room. Carol is not hit, but faints, and when she revives, she and Bob' become reconciled.

Cast 

Monte Blue as Bob Hilton
Willard Louis as Arthur Atherton
Beverly Bayne as Carol Hilton
Margaret Livingston as Estelle Winslow
John Roche as Ted Lowe
Priscilla Moran as	Barbara
Mary Grabhorn as Janey
Martha Petelle as Mrs. Pelham
Aileen Manning as Spinster
Arthur Hoyt as Winslow
Walter Wilkinson (uncredited)
Betsy Ann Hisle as The Hilton Daughter (uncredited)

Box office 
According to Warner Bros. records, the film earned $210,000 domestically and $23,000 in foreign markets.

Preservation status 
A print of Her Marriage Vow is preserved in Filmarchiv Austria.

References

External links 

1924 films
1920s English-language films
Silent American drama films
1924 drama films
Warner Bros. films
Films directed by Millard Webb
American silent feature films
American black-and-white films
1920s American films